Howe High School may refer to:

Howe High School (Howe, Oklahoma)
Howe High School (Texas), Howe, Texas
Thomas Carr Howe Community High School, Indianapolis